Lyric and Beat is a Philippine youth-oriented romantic comedy drama musical streaming television series. Directed by Dolly Dulu, the series premiered on August 10 to September 23, 2022, on iWantTFC.

This series pays tribute to the "20 years of music" of ABS-CBN Music's creative director Jonathan Manalo.

Plot
Lyric (Andrea Brillantes), a bubbly and aspiring singer, is willing to do everything to fulfill her dream despite her father's (Lito Pimentel) constant objections. Having seen her potential and being offered a scholarship, Lyric finally enters the fictional Philippine National Conservatory of Music where she would meet Beat (Seth Fedelin), a soft-spoken singer and dancer. It is from there that students will compete against each other for the privilege to represent the school in the National Music Competition, a well-renowned school-based competition for music, that will test different friendships and their competitive spirit.

Cast and characters

Main cast
Andrea Brillantes as Lyric, a driven teenager who aspires to be a famous singer like her late mother
Seth Fedelin as Beat, an introverted freshman who developed stage fright
Darren Espanto as Jazz, team captain of the Prime Belters and one of the best singers in PNCM
AC Bonifacio as Cadence, Jazz's best friend who wants to introduce dancing in show choir
Kyle Echarri as Grae, the team captain of a rival school
Angela Ken as Virlyn, a church choir member who is proficient in musical instruments
Jeremy Glinoga as Stevie, a student who stutters but not when he sings
Sheena Belarmino as Melissa, Jazz's sister and a resident mean girl
Awra Briguela as Unique, a student who often refuses to accept criticisms

Supporting cast
Agot Isidro as Viola Espiritu
Nyoy Volante as Wolfgang Aragon
Joel Saracho as Principal William Guico
Jett Pangan as Peter
Lilet Esteban as Isay
Lito Pimentel as Jeff
Upeng Fernandez as Lola Carmen
Gian Magdangal as Adrian
Pinky Amador as Sonja
Alora Sasam as Smile
Sheenly Gener as Candy
Brian Sy as Rajo

Team Werpa
Trisha Fabe as Mai
Aicy Fabe as Mia

Team Prime Belters
Roco Sanchez
RJ Perkins
Anton Posadas
Ivanka Guillermo
Kei Kurosawa
Kysha Navarro
CJ De Guzman

Team School of Modern Pop
Joshua Decena
Jasper Almario
Jom Logdat
Chael Ablaza
Planes Jose Mari
Ryzen Magpayo
Ysai Castro
Kiara Dario
Trisha Martin
JM Yrreverre

Supporting roles
James Graham as Tomie
Jonathan Manalo as Judge
Stephen Vinas as Judge
Charleine Gonzales as Host
Anna Graham as Beat's mom
Pongss Leonardo as Bar Manager
Jackie Papica as Amiga 1
Maribel Domingo as Amiga 2

Special participation
PJ Endrinal as Prez

Episodes

Official soundtrack 
The first volume of the official soundtrack for the series was released on August 12, 2022, and consists of tracks mostly composed by Jonathan Manalo with some contributions from Jeremy Glinoga, Anna Graham, Rox Santos, Vice Ganda, and Itchyworms's co-lead vocalist Jazz Nicolas. The soundtrack includes an earlier released single "Ako Naman Muna" by Angela Ken, albeit not a Manalo original composition, is also part of the series.

The second volume of the official soundtrack was released on August 26, 2022, with the inclusion of "That Hero" by Iñigo Pascual, Kidwolf, and Theo Martel.

The third and fourth volumes of the official soundtrack were released on September 9 and 23, 2022 respectively.

Production
Due to the restrictions caused by the COVID-19 pandemic in the Philippines, production was done with safety protocols implemented, and all actors and production staff underwent lock-in taping in Baguio until, as per Instagram update from cast member Darren Espanto, taping has concluded in March 2022. Prior to lock-in tapings, the cast have attended workshops and rehearsals in December 2021.

Casting
Brillantes, Fedelin, Espanto, Bonifacio, Ken, Glinoga, and Belarmino (on her first acting project) are first announced as main cast members in late 2021. In February 2022, fresh from his stint in Pinoy Big Brother: Kumunity Season 10, Echarri was included as main cast member. Volante meanwhile reprise his role as an actor.

Marketing
An earlier teaser was released in November 2021 on ABS-CBN Entertainment's social media platforms, initially to be premiered on iQiyi after the Philippine media company and the Chinese online on-demand video streaming platform created a partnership, with ABS-CBN already producing content for iQiyi, including Hello, Heart and Saying Goodbye.

However, in a new teaser released in July 2022 on its YouTube channel, it was announced that it will be released on iWantTFC this August 2022. No details to such a move was made. The full trailer was released on July 13, 2022, on iWantTFC's social media platforms with August 10, 2022, as the slated release date. After the trailer's release, the hashtag #LyricAndBeatTrailer made it to the top trending topics in Twitter Philippines.

Music
Most of the music being used feature original compositions from ABS-CBN Music creative director Jonathan Manalo who has made about 400 original compositions since becoming the grand winner of the 2001 edition of Himig Handog with his winning piece Tara Tena.

Release

Broadcast
The series premiered on August 10 to September 23, 2022, on iWantTFC.

The series had its Philippine TV Premiere from October 9 to November 27, 2022, on Yes Weekend Sunday primetime on Kapamilya Channel, Kapamilya Online Live and A2Z replacing Run To Me and was replaced by third season of Click, Like, Share. It also aired international via TFC (The Filipino Channel).

Notes

References

External links
 
 Lyric and Beat on iWantTFC

ABS-CBN drama series
IWantTFC original programming
2022 Philippine television series debuts
2022 Philippine television series endings
2022 web series debuts
Philippine musical television series